The  King Island Football Association (KIFA) is an Australian rules football competition held in Tasmania, Australia. Three clubs from small communities on King Island  compete for the premiership every year.

History

The formation of the competition was originally thought to be in 1908. However the first games were played in 1903 between North and Currie football clubs. The King Island Football Association (KIFA) was formed in 1914 with the introduction of the third team the Pegarah rovers.The competition peaked at 4 teams in the 1950s with the introduction of the Grassy and Mount Stanley football clubs.In the interim Pegarah Rovers had folded, Pegarah and loorana fielded teams but disbanded by 1938. 

One of Australia's most isolated, and almost certainly its smallest football league, the three teams play ten games each in a fifteen round competition plus finals.

The King Island Football Association played under the Victorian Football Association's rival throw-pass rules from 1946 until 1948, meaning that throwing the football in general play was legal during those years.

Premierships
List of premiership teams of KIFA.

1904 NORTH 
1905 NORTH 
1906 NORTH 
1907 CURRIE 
1908 CURRIE 
1909 Unknown
1910 CURRIE 
1911 Unknown
1912 CURRIE 
1913 NORTH 
1914 NORTH 
1915 NORTH 
1916 NO PREMIERSHIP AWARDED
1917 NO PREMIERSHIP AWARDED
1918 NO PREMIERSHIP AWARDED
1919 CURRIE 
1920 CURRIE 
1921 CURRIE 
1922 NORTH 
1923 CURRIE 
1924 CURRIE 
1925 NORTH 
1926 CURRIE 
1927 NORTH 
1928 NORTH 
1929 CURRIE 
1930 NORTH 
1931 CURRIE 
1932 NORTH 
1933 CURRIE 

1934 CURRIE 
1935 CURRIE 
1936 LOORANA 
1937 CURRIE 
1938 NORTH 
1939 CURRIE 
1940 NORTH 
1941 NO PREMIERSHIP AWARDED
1942 NO PREMIERSHIP AWARDED
1943 NO PREMIERSHIP AWARDED
1944 NO PREMIERSHIP AWARDED
1945 NORTH 
1946 GRASSY 
1947 GRASSY 
1948 CURRIE 
1949 GRASSY 
1950 NORTH 
1951 NORTH 
1952 NORTH 
1953 GRASSY 
1954 CURRIE 
1955 GRASSY 
1956 NORTH 
1957 GRASSY 
1958 GRASSY 
1959 NORTH 
1960 CURRIE 
1961 NORTH 
1962 CURRIE 
1963 CURRIE 

1964 CURRIE 
1965 NORTH 
1966 NORTH 
1967 CURRIE 
1968 CURRIE 
1969 NORTH 
1970 NORTH 
1971 NORTH 
1972 CURRIE 
1973 NORTH 
1974 NORTH 
1975 CURRIE 
1976 NORTH 
1977 CURRIE 
1978 GRASSY 
1979 CURRIE 
1980 NORTH 
1981 CURRIE 
1982 CURRIE 
1983 NORTH 
1984 NORTH 
1985 NORTH 
1986 CURRIE 
1987 NORTH 
1988 CURRIE 
1989 CURRIE 
1990 CURRIE 
1991 NORTH 
1992 CURRIE 
1993 NORTH 

1994 NORTH 
1995 CURRIE 
1996 CURRIE 
1997 NORTH 
1998 GRASSY 
1999 NORTH 
2000 NORTH 
2001 NORTH 
2002 NORTH 
2003 NORTH 
2004 NORTH 
2005 GRASSY 
2006 GRASSY 
2007 NORTH 
2008 NORTH 
2009 GRASSY 
2010 CURRIE 
2011 CURRIE 
2012 GRASSY 
2013 NORTH
2014 GRASSY
2015 GRASSY
2016 CURRIE
2017 NORTH
2018 CURRIE
2019 NORTH
2020 No competition
2021 GRASSY
2022 GRASSY

Current Clubs

Previous Clubs

Published books
Australian rules football in Tasmania, John Stoward, 2002, 
Beyond the Big Sticks, Paul Daffey, 2003,

References

Australian rules football competitions in Tasmania
King Island (Tasmania)
1908 establishments in Australia